Sebastiano Brunetti (died 1649) was an Italian painter active in his native Bologna. He first trained with Lucio Massari, then Guido Reni. He painted a Guardian Angel for the church of Santa Maria Maggiore at Bologna, and a Holy Family for the church of San Giuseppe Sposo, and for Santa Margherita, a Mary Magdalen praying in the Desert.

References

Year of birth missing
1649 deaths
17th-century Italian painters
Italian male painters
Painters from Bologna
Italian Baroque painters